Copestake is an English surname. Notable people with the surname include:

Ann Copestake, British computational linguist
Joe Copestake (1859–?), English footballer
Levi Copestake (1886–1968), English footballer
Oliver Copestake (1921–1953), English footballer

See also
Copestake Peak, a mountain of South Georgia

English-language surnames